"Amantes de una Noche" is a song by Dominican singer Natti Natasha and Puerto Rican rapper Bad Bunny, released by Pina Records on 12 January 2018.

Background
"Amantes de una Noche" was written by two singers, Alexis Guzmán, DJ Luian, Jean Carlos Pacheco, Mambo Kingz, and its producers Daddy Yankee, MikeyTone and Gaby Music. It is a midtempo reggaeton song.

Music video
The music video for "Amantes de una Noche" was directed by Venezuelan director Nuno Gómes and filmed in Miami. Gómes previously directed Natasha's music video for "Criminal". The singer revealed that she portrayed a character in the video because she personally does not identify with being comfortable with one-night stands. "It is a situation that occurs a lot in the world and I thought ... why not dedicate a topic to that?", she explained. Regarding the filming process, Natasha said, "I didn't take it as if I was recording a video, but as if I was at a real party."

The music video received over 52 million on YouTube in its first week of release, and has since surpassed over 390 million views on the platform. Marjua Estevez of Billboard called it a "sizzling video" and "a lesson from Natti on how to hook-and-catch Mr. Man". However, other reviewers were critical of Natasha's appearance. In Hoy, Tommy Calle wrote that she was used to add visual appeal and "left little to the imagination". Sergio Burstein of The Baltimore Sun accused Natasha of appeasing to men and sexism through "the usual game of the industry" and "absolute lack of prejudice to constantly show herself in intimate clothing from the most daring in order to awaken desire by highlighting her obvious physical benefits."

Charts

Weekly charts

Year-end charts

Certifications

References

2018 singles
2018 songs
Bad Bunny songs
Natti Natasha songs
Reggaeton songs
Songs written by Bad Bunny
Songs written by Daddy Yankee
Songs written by Rafael Pina
Spanish-language songs
Songs written by Edgar Semper
Songs written by Xavier Semper